This is a list of freshwater fish found in Iceland.

References

Iceland,freshwater